Greasy Pop Records was an Australian independent record label established by Doug Thomas (musician with The Dagoes and with The Spikes) in 1980 in Adelaide. Greasy Pop Records predominantly signed South Australian artists including Exploding White Mice, Where's the Pope?, Del Webb Explosion and The Mad Turks from Istanbul. As from 2006, the label was owned by Pete Hartman-Kearns and Monique Laver. According to I-94 Bar's Patrick Emery, Greasy Pop "was the focus of much of the city’s vibrant music scene, putting out great records ... Much of the Greasy Pop stable was based on the Detroit-via-Birdman thing – it's interesting that while Adelaide continues to share a cultural affinity closer to Melbourne than Sydney, its musical influences arguably owe more to the Sydney and the Birdman sound than the art-school aesthetic of Melbourne".

History
Greasy Pop Records was an independent record label founded by Doug Thomas in 1980. From May 1978 Thomas was a guitarist for Adelaide-based indie rock group The Dagoes (as Frankie Thomas). In February 1980 Thomas financed The Dagoes extended play, The Dagoes Sell Soul which was "American-oriented rock'n'roll" and was the debut release by Greasy Pop. Late in 1982 The Dagoes disbanded and early in 1983 Thomas formed a "hard-edged, swampy acid-pop" band, The Spikes, which also released its material on Greasy Pop. In 1985, Greasy Pop issued a compilation album of tracks, An Oasis in a Desert of Noise, by its popular artists: Exploding White Mice, The Mad Turks from Istanbul, The Spikes, Primitive Painters, Dust Collection, Plague, Garden Path, Verge, Ded Nats, On Heat and Primevils. In 2006, Greasy Pop issued a DVD, An Oasis in a Desert of Celluloid, with 33 music videos. As from August 2006, the label was owned by Pete Hartman-Kearns and Monique Laver. According to I-94 Bar's Patrick Emery, Greasy Pop "was the focus of much of the city’s vibrant music scene, putting out great records ... Much of the Greasy Pop stable was based on the Detroit-via-Birdman thing – it's interesting that while Adelaide continues to share a cultural affinity closer to Melbourne than Sydney, its musical influences arguably owe more to the Sydney and the Birdman sound than the art-school aesthetic of Melbourne".

Artists
 Aunty Raylene
 Batteries not Included
 Bloodloss
 The Dagoes
 Liz Dealey and the Twenty Second Sect
 Ded Nats
 Del Webb Explosion
 Devil's Cabaret
 The Dust Collection
 The Every Brothers
 Exploding White Mice
 Garden Path
 Greg Williams
 Handmedowns
 Iron Sheiks
 
 The Lizard Train
 The Mad Turks from Istanbul aka The Mad Turks
 Morning Glory
 The Philisteins
 Plague
 Play Loud
 Primitive Painters
 Screaming Believers
 The Spikes
 Undecided
 Where's the Pope?
 Neptune Lollyshoppe

References

General
 
 
  Note: Archived [on-line] copy has limited functionality.
 
 
Specific

External links
  archived on 21 February 2009 from the original which appears to be inactive.
 Greasy Pop Records search results at Music Australia published by National Library of Australia.
 "Greasy Pop Records" article originally printed in Noise for Heroes, No. 18, Winter 1990. Archived from original from NKVD Records website copy on 30 April 2009.

Australian independent record labels
Record labels established in 1980
Rock record labels